Big Blue Lake (translit. Da lan hu) is a 2011 Hong Kong drama film directed by Jessey Tsang Tsui-Shan.

Cast
 Leila Tong
 Lawrence Chou
 Amy Chum
 Angi Au
 Lillian Ho
 Philip Ng
 Ben Yeung

References

External links
 

2011 films
2011 drama films
2010s Cantonese-language films
Hong Kong drama films
2010s Hong Kong films